Greatest Hits is a compilation album by American country music artist John Anderson. It is Anderson's second compilation album of that name and third overall. It was released on October 15, 1996 as his last studio album for BNA Records.

The version of "Swingin'" on this release is a remake of the original 1982 hit version.

Track listing

Chart performance

References

John Anderson (musician) albums
1996 greatest hits albums
Albums produced by James Stroud
RCA Records compilation albums